The E. K. Burnham House is a historic house located in Cape Vincent, Jefferson County, New York.

Description and history 
It is an Italianate style brick residence built in 1870. It has a three-story, three-bay-wide main block with a central belvedere. Also on the property are a garage and two boathouses built in 1919.

It was listed on the National Register of Historic Places on September 27, 1985.

References

Houses on the National Register of Historic Places in New York (state)
Italianate architecture in New York (state)
Houses completed in 1870
Houses in Jefferson County, New York
National Register of Historic Places in Jefferson County, New York